At Crooked Lake is a 1972 album released by the group Crazy Horse. The album marked the departure of guitarist and former Rockets member George Whitsell, as well as organ player John Blanton. In their place for this album were Rick and Michael Curtis.

Track listing
Side 1
"Rock and Roll Band" (Sydney Jordon) - 3:11
"Love Is Gone" (Rick Curtis, Mike Curtis) - 3:16
"We Ride" (Rick Curtis) - 3:13
"Outside Lookin' In" (Greg Leroy) - 2:06
"Don't Keep Me Burning" (Rick Curtis) - 4:17
Side 2
"Vehicle" (Rick Curtis) - 3:41
"Your Song" (Greg Leroy) - 2:43
"Lady Soul" (Mike Curtis) - 3:11
"Don't Look Back" (Rick Curtis) - 3:29
"85 El Paso's" (Greg Leroy) - 4:54

Personnel
 Billy Talbot - bass, backing vocals
 Ralph Molina - drums, backing vocals
 Greg Leroy - guitars, bottleneck guitar, lead and backing vocals
 Michael Curtis - organ, guitars, mandolin, piano, lead and backing vocals
 Rick Curtis - banjo, guitars, lead and backing vocals

Additional personnel
 "Sneaky" Pete Kleinow - pedal steel
 Patti Moan - vocals
 Bobby Notkoff - violin
 Ronald Stone - producer
 David Brown - engineer
 Johnny Pacheco - conductor

References

1972 albums
Crazy Horse (band) albums
Epic Records albums